Ginnelaram is a village in Rowthulapudi Mandal, Kakinada district in the state of Andhra Pradesh in India.

Geography 

Demographics 
 India census, Ginnelaram had a population of 136, out of which 64 were male and 72 were female. Population of children below 6 years of age were 6. The literacy rate of the village is 33.08%.

References 

Villages in Rowthulapudi mandal